Vladimir Gudelj (born 27 December 1966) is a Bosnian former professional footballer who played as a striker.

An excellent penalty taker, he was best known for his eight-year spell with Spain's Celta.

Club career
Gudelj was born in Trebinje, Socialist Federal Republic of Yugoslavia. After making his professional debuts with FK Velež Mostar he moved to Spain, signing with RC Celta de Vigo in the second division. He scored 27 league goals in his debut season, the Galicians promoted to La Liga and the player continued to lead the scoring charts for his club the following five years.

Gudelj left Celta in 1999 as the player with most goals in its history, with almost 100 (68 in the top flight alone). He then joined neighbours SD Compostela, returning to the second level and being the best scorer of the team in both campaigns.

In the summer of 2001 Gudelj returned to Celta, going on to work in the public relations department.

Honours
Celta Vigo
Segunda División: 1991–92

Individual
Pichichi Trophy (Segunda División): 1991–92

References

External links

Celta de Vigo biography 

1966 births
Living people
People from Trebinje
Yugoslav footballers
Bosnia and Herzegovina footballers
Association football forwards
Yugoslav First League players
FK Velež Mostar players
La Liga players
Segunda División players
RC Celta de Vigo players
SD Compostela footballers
Croatian Football League players
HNK Hajduk Split players
Yugoslav expatriate footballers
Bosnia and Herzegovina expatriate footballers
Expatriate footballers in Spain
Expatriate footballers in Croatia
Yugoslav expatriate sportspeople in Spain
Bosnia and Herzegovina expatriate sportspeople in Spain
Bosnia and Herzegovina expatriate sportspeople in Croatia